Ricard is a surname, as well as a Catalan name. Notable people with the surname include:

Étienne Pierre Sylvestre Ricard (1771–1843), French general under Napoleon
Hámilton Ricard (born 1974), Colombian footballer
Jean-François Ricard (born 1956), French prosecutor of the National Terrorism Prosecution Office for the prosecution of terrorism in France
Jean-Pierre Ricard (born 1944), Catholic cardinal, Archbishop of Bordeaux 
John Ricard (born 1940), U.S. Catholic bishop
Matthieu Ricard (born 1946), French Buddhist monk
Patrick Ricard (American football) (born 1994), American football player
Paul Ricard (1909–1997), French entrepreneur
René Ricard (1946–2014), American poet, art critic, and painter
Théogène Ricard (1909–2006), Canadian politician

See also
 Ricard, a French distilled beverages company which merged with Pernod Fils to form Pernod Ricard
Ricards Lodge High School, Comprehensive secondary school for girls in Wimbledon
Paul Ricard (disambiguation)
Ricardo (disambiguation)
Richard (disambiguation)

French-language surnames